The Big Four Conference was an intercollegiate athletic conference that existed from 1929 to 1932. Its membership was centered on the state of Oklahoma.

Former members

 Notes

Football champions

See also
List of defunct college football conferences

References